The sex hygiene film was a genre of film dealing with stories involving sexual health, particularly sexually transmitted disease (hence the slang label "clap opera"), but also sometimes touching on topics such as prostitution, birth control, and illegitimacy. The genre had its origins in the United States around the time of World War I. Early sex hygiene films were created by mainstream studios and, though their treatment of a taboo topic was controversial, they were perceived as having positive educational value. By the 1920s, sex hygiene films had begun to include graphic depictions of human anatomy, and the genre evolved into an early example of exploitation films.

Sex hygiene films were publicly exhibited at theatres and often drew large audiences, though attendance was sometimes limited to adults, or to only one sex.

List of sex hygiene films

See also
 Pre-Code sex films
 Sexploitation film
 Social hygiene movement
 Social guidance film
 Social problem film

References

sex hygiene